Roger Black is an American insult comedian, actor, voice actor, animator, writer and producer known for his character Yucko the Clown.

Yucko first became a guest on The Howard Stern Show by carrying a Howard Stern sign onto the field during a major league baseball game. At the height of the D.C. sniper attacks in 2002, Roger dressed as Yucko The Clown carried a target as he pumped gas at various gas stations around the D.C area. He later became a regular guest, appearing in the studio and eventually competing and becoming a finalist in the Get John's Job contest.

He is also known for starring in The DAMN! Show along with fellow writer Waco O'Guin and the MTV2 series Stankervision, which included sketches from The DAMN! Show and ran for one season of eight episodes.

O'Guin and Black's animated comedy series Brickleberry, executive-produced by Daniel Tosh, premiered on September 25, 2012, on Comedy Central. The series was canceled in January 2015 and ended in April of that year.

In 2018, Black and O'Guin created the Netflix animated series Paradise PD and in 2022 both worked together to create Farzar, also a Netflix adult animation series.

References

External links

Living people
Fictional clowns
American stand-up comedians
American male voice actors
Year of birth missing (living people)